District No. 70-Hoff Rural School near Adams, North Dakota was built in 1885.  It was listed on the National Register of Historic Places in 2008.

It is a small wood-frame building.  It was a country school "typical of many one-room school buildings", located near the boundary line between Norton and Vesta townships.

References

External links
Photo of school

Neoclassical architecture in North Dakota
School buildings completed in 1885
Schools in Walsh County, North Dakota
School buildings on the National Register of Historic Places in North Dakota
National Register of Historic Places in Walsh County, North Dakota
1885 establishments in Dakota Territory
One-room schoolhouses in North Dakota